Essa Obaid (Arabic: عيسى عبيد, born September 27, 1979 in Dubai, United Arab Emirates) is an IFBB professional bodybuilder. Essa was first person from the Persian Gulf region to participate in the Mr. Olympia competition in bodybuilding. As of September 18, 2015, Essa is officially sponsored by BPI Sports in the Mr. Olympia 2015 competition.

Stats
 Height: 5 ft 9in
 Weight: 250 lbs

Sponsors
Essa is sponsored by Hamdan bin Mohammed Al Maktoum Crown Prince of Dubai.

Contest history
 2001 World Arab Championships (Egypt) - 2nd Heavyweight
 2001 Abu Dhabi Championships (UAE) - Winner Heavyweight Teen & Open Men
 2003 Fujairah Classic (UAE) - Winner Heavyweight
 2004 World Arab Championships (Morocco) - 2nd Heavyweight
 2007 Al Ain Classic (UAE) - Winner Super Heavyweight
 2008 Hammer Gym Classic (Oman) - Winner Super Heavyweight
 2010 Arnold Amateur (USA) - Overall Winner and IFBB Pro Card
 2010 IFBB Europa Championships - Winner
 2011 IFBB Arnold Classic - 13th
 2011 IFBB British Grand Prix - 7th
 2011 IFBB Mr Europe Grand Prix - 6th
 2011 IFBB FIBO Pro - 8th
 2012 Europa Battle of Champions - 3rd
 2012 Wings of Strength Chicago Pro - Winner
 2012 Mr. Olympia – 14th
 2013 IFBB Wings of Strength Chicago - 4th
 2013 IFBB PBW Tampa Pro - 3rd
 2013 IFBB Dallas Europa Supershow - 2nd
 2013 Mr. Olympia – 16th
 2015 Mr.Olympia - 10th

References

 http://contest.bodybuilding.com/bio/194841/

 https://www.tigerfitness.com/motivation/

External links
essaobaid.com – Website

Emirati bodybuilders
1979 births
Living people
Professional bodybuilders
Sportspeople from Dubai